The 1993 Ms. Olympia contest was an IFBB professional bodybuilding competition was held on November 27, 1993, at the Beacon Theatre in New York City, New York. It was the 14th Ms. Olympia competition held.

Results

See also
 1993 Mr. Olympia

References

 Ms. Olympia report
 1993 Ms. Olympia held in New York on November 27th
 1993 Ms Olympia Results

External links
 Competitor History of the Ms. Olympia

Ms Olympia, 1993
1993 in bodybuilding
Ms. Olympia
Ms. Olympia
History of female bodybuilding